Adrián 'Adri' Rafael Castellano Cobacho (born 26 June 1994) is a Spanish footballer who plays for SD Ponferradina as a left back.

Club career
Born in Córdoba, Andalusia, Castellano joined Real Madrid's youth setup in 2011, after stints at Córdoba CF and Séneca CF. He made his senior debuts with the C-team in 2012, in Segunda División B.

In February 2013 Castellano was linked to Manchester City and Manchester United, but nothing came of it. On 8 July of the following year he signed for UD Almería, being assigned to the reserves also in the third level.

On 9 September 2015 Castellano made his professional debut, starting in a 3–3 Copa del Rey home draw against Elche CF (4–3 win on penalties). He made his Segunda División debut four days later, playing the full 90 minutes in a 0–1 loss at CD Lugo.

On 5 July 2016 Castellano joined another reserve team, Celta de Vigo B also in the third tier. Roughly one year later, he moved to fellow league team Granada CF B.

On 5 June 2018, Castellano signed a new two-year contract with the Andalusians, being definitely promoted to the main squad in the second division. He contributed with seven appearances during the campaign, as his side achieved promotion to La Liga.

On 5 July 2019, Castellano signed a two-year deal with CD Numancia in the second level. On 28 August of the following year, after suffering relegation, he joined fellow second division side SD Ponferradina.

References

External links

1994 births
Living people
Footballers from Córdoba, Spain
Spanish footballers
Footballers from Andalusia
Association football defenders
Segunda División players
Segunda División B players
Real Madrid C footballers
UD Almería B players
UD Almería players
Celta de Vigo B players
Club Recreativo Granada players
Granada CF footballers
CD Numancia players
SD Ponferradina players